Isaak Vossius, sometimes anglicised Isaac Voss (1618 in Leiden – 21 February 1689 in Windsor, Berkshire) was a Dutch scholar and manuscript collector.

Life
He was the son of the humanist Gerhard Johann Vossius. Isaak formed what was accounted the best private library in the world (Massil 2003).  He had a contemporary reputation for eccentricity, refusing the sacrament on his deathbed, it was reported, until reminded that to do so would reflect unfavorably on the canons of St George's Chapel, Windsor Castle, to which chapter he belonged.

He was raised in the atmosphere of a scholarly household, familiar with Greek, ancient geography, and Arabic from an early age.  In 1641, he undertook a European tour, in which he visited England, France and Italy (notably Florence), making the acquaintance of scholars of the elder generation such as James Ussher and Hugo Grotius and beginning his lifelong collecting of manuscripts and books before he returned to Amsterdam in 1644 to take up a position as city librarian.

There he enriched the library that had been founded by Gustavus Adolphus, partly as booty of war from the library of Prague, with judicious purchases, but incurred the enmity of the French philologist Claudius Salmasius. At the death of his father in 1650, he returned briefly to Amsterdam to oversee the shipping of his father's library to Stockholm. He determined to leave Sweden in 1654, and after Christina abdicated upon her conversion to Catholicism, he followed her to Brussels, where he took his leave of her. The impecunious queen paid her former librarian's outstanding back pay in books, among which was the Codex Argenteus. In 1664 Vossius was elected a Fellow of the Royal Society in London.

After his brilliant, though at times controversial, career of scholarship in Sweden, Vossius went to England in 1670, received a degree in civil law from Oxford, and became residentiary canon at Windsor in 1673, a post he held until 1688, shortly before his death.  In the later stage of his life, his interests turned to mathematics and natural history.

After his death, his heirs sold his library of books and manuscripts to the University of Leiden. Still today, the 729 Codices Vossiani are catalogued under shelfmarks identifying his collection: 
VLF, VLQ,  VLO – Latin folio, quarto and octo
VGF, VGQ, VGO – Greek folio, quarto and octo
VMI – miscellenae (mixed Latin and Greek)
VGG F, VGG Q – Germano-Gallico (Germanic and Romance languages) folio and quarto 
VCF, VCQ, VCO – medical, pharmaceutical and alchemical manuscripts, folio, quarto and octo.

Works

He was the author of De septuaginta interpretibus (1661), De poematum cantu et viribus rhythmi (1673), and Variarum observationum liber (1685).

See also
 Coenraad van Beuningen

Notes

References

The Cambridge History of English and American Literature(1907–21). Volume VII. xiii Scholars and Scholarship, 1600–60: § 2. Close relations between English and continental scholars. Brief sketch of Vossius' intellectual milieu.
Steven Massil, 2003. "Immigrant librarians in Britain: Huguenots and Some Others" (pdf file)

Further reading
 F.F. Blok: Isaac Vossius and his circle, His life until his farewell to Queen Christina of Sweden, 1618-1655. Groningen, Forsten, 2000. 
P.R. Sellin, 2004. "Isaac Vossius and his Circle: His Life until his Farewell to Queen Christina of Sweden, 1618–1655" in English Historical Review, 119,  June 2004, pp. 720–722.
Jan Willem De Crane, Oratio de De Vossiorum Juniorumque Familia (Francker, 1821)
J. E. Sandys, A History of Classical Scholarship, volume ii (Cambridge, 1908)

External links
Castigationes ad scriptum Georgii Hornii de ætate mundi (1659) - full digital facsimile from Linda Hall Library
The Correspondence of Isaac Vossius in EMLO

1618 births
1689 deaths
People from Leiden
17th-century Latin-language writers
Dutch classical scholars
Dutch librarians
Dutch music theorists
Fellows of the Royal Society
Canons of Windsor